Spitzberg (Tübingen) is a mountain of Baden-Württemberg, Germany. It is located within the city of Tübingen.

See also 
 List of hills of the Schönbuch

Mountains and hills of Baden-Württemberg